The 1995 Castle Point Borough Council election took place on 4 May 1995 to elect members of Castle Point Borough Council in Essex, England.

Results summary

References

Castle Point Borough Council elections
1995 English local elections
1990s in Essex